A R 'Rennie' Logan (1928-2003) was a former Scottish international lawn bowler.

Bowls career
He won a silver medal in the fours at the 1972 World Outdoor Bowls Championship in Worthing. He also won a gold medal in the team event (Leonard Trophy).

Family
His sons Raymond, Eric and Kenny Logan were all capped by Scotland. Another son, Gordon Logan, played in the English Football League for Port Vale. Nicknamed the Laughing Cavalier he died in 2003. His grandson Grant Logan won gold at the 2011 Atlantic Bowls Championships.

References

Scottish male bowls players
1928 births
2003 deaths